Singampuli is an Indian actor and director. After making Red (2002) and Maayavi (2005), he has made a career appearing in supporting roles in films.

Career
Singampuli was born and brought up in Theni, Periyakulam and after studying engineering in Bangalore, he arrived in Chennai looking for a career in films. During his stint as an assistant director with Sundar C, Singampuli suggested the original plot point of Unnaithedi to the director and Sundar wrote the script of the film within a week, before discussing the line with actor Ajith Kumar. Ajith was initially unimpressed but agreed to do the romantic story anyway, mentioning that if the film became a success he would feature in a future film to be directed by Singampuli. Subsequently, he agreed terms to work in the 2002 action film Red, a story telling the tale of a Madurai-based revolutionary. The film opened to mixed reviews upon release and eventually the film had an average run at the box office but went on to gain cult status among ajith fans after some years. In 2005, he made the kidnap comedy film Maayavi featuring Suriya and Jyothika, winning acclaim for his work.

Director Bala cast him in an acting role as a beggar in Naan Kadavul (2009) and since Singampuli has appeared in several films in supporting roles. His recent appearance in the Mysskin's directorial 'Psycho' earned a very good reputation in the filmy community.

Filmography

As director

As assistant director

As dialogue writer

As actor

As dubbing artist

Web series

References

External links
 

Living people
Tamil comedians
Tamil male actors
Male actors in Tamil cinema
Tamil film directors
1968 births
People from Theni district
Male actors from Tamil Nadu
21st-century Indian male actors
Indian male comedians
Screenwriters from Tamil Nadu
Tamil screenwriters